The Great Barrier Reef Foundation is an Australian non-profit organisation established in 1999 to help protect and preserve the Great Barrier Reef. The foundation was formed in response to the first mass coral bleaching of the reef in 1998.  Climate change is the number one threat to the Great Barrier Reef and coral reefs globally. The foundation is the lead charity for the Great Barrier Reef, funding more than 300 projects with over 400 partners bringing together science, traditional owners, community, citizen science, government, business and NGOs in the mission to save the Reef and all its living diversity for future generations.

2018 Government grant 
During the International Year of the Reef in 2018 the Turnbull Government announced a AUD$443 million grant to the foundation. The purpose of the grant is to achieve significant, measurable improvement in the health of the Great Barrier Reef World Heritage Area in accordance with the Reef 2050 framework and underpinned by innovation, science and community engagement:   

Projects enabled through the partnership between the Australian Government's Reef Trust and the foundation have six areas of focus: water quality, crown-of-thorns starfish control, reef restoration and adaptation science, traditional owner reef protection, community Reef protection and integrated monitoring and reporting.

References 

Organizations established in 1999
1999 establishments in Australia
Non-profit organisations based in Queensland
Environmental charities based in Australia
Great Barrier Reef